The 1971 Sacramento State Hornets football team represented Sacramento State College—now known as California State University, Sacramento—as a member of the Far Western Conference (FWC) during the 1971 NCAA College Division football season. Led by 11th-year head coach Ray Clemons, Sacramento State compiled an overall record of 4–5–1  with a mark of 2–3–1 in conference play, placing fifth in the FWC. The team was outscored by its opponents 238 to 228 for the season. The Hornets played home games at Hornet Stadium in Sacramento, California.

Schedule

References

Sacramento State
Sacramento State Hornets football seasons
Sacramento State Hornets football